The 1995 Las Vegas Sting season was the second season for the Las Vegas Sting. They finished the 1995 Arena Football League season 6–6 and were one of two teams in the American Conference to miss the playoffs.

Schedule

Regular season

Standings

Awards

References

Anaheim Piranhas seasons
1995 Arena Football League season
Las Vegas Sting Season, 1995